Alberto Quintana may refer to:
Alberto Quintana (footballer, born 1996), Spanish football midfielder
Alberto Quintana (footballer, born 2001), Spanish football defender